Jakob Lewald (born 26 February 1999) is a German professional footballer who plays as a defender for 3. Liga club Dynamo Dresden.

References

External links

1999 births
Living people
German footballers
Association football defenders
SV Werder Bremen players
BSV Schwarz-Weiß Rehden players
FC Viktoria 1889 Berlin players
Dynamo Dresden players
3. Liga players
Regionalliga players